Emmy van Deurzen (born 13 December 1951 in The Hague, Netherlands) is an existential therapist. She developed a philosophical therapy based in existential-phenomenology.

Biography
van Deurzen was born and raised in The Hague, in The Netherlands, then went to France to study, where she earned two master's degrees, one in philosophy, at the University of Montpellier, where she studied with Michel Henry, and one in clinical psychology, at the University of Bordeaux, during which time she was supervised by Dr. François Tosquelles. She wrote her thesis on phenomenology and psychiatry in relation to solitude and loneliness for her philosophy dissertation and on attempted suicide for her clinical psychology thesis.  She worked as psychotherapist in France, then moved to the UK in 1977, where she became involved in antipsychiatry activism and worked for some time with R. D. Laing. She came to her own version of existential therapy, and started teaching at Antioch University, after which she moved to Regent's University London when the program moved there, joining the Regent's faculty when the program was incorporated into the college.

She published her first book on her approach in 1987 and the next year founded the Society for Existential Analysis (SEA) and its Journal of Existential Analysis. After she left Regent's, she founded the New School for Psychotherapy and Counselling, and a conflict resolution centre. In 2005 she became an honorary professor at the University of Sheffield. She did her PhD on Heidegger's concepts of authenticity and inauthenticity and their relevance to psychotherapy, at City University, London. She has published widely on existential therapy and her work has been translated into twenty plus languages. She contributed numerous ideas to existential therapy, including that of the four worlds model and the emotional compass.

In 2014 she and her husband Prof Digby Tantam, created the Existential Academy, a community interest company, in West Hampstead, where they offer five masters programmes and two doctoral programmes in conjunction with Middlesex University, as well as a range of short courses. (www.existentialacademy.com)

Honours

As listed by the University of Sheffield.
 2007–2008 - Visiting Associate, Darwin College, Cambridge University
 2006 – Fellow, United Kingdom Council for Psychotherapy
 2005 – Honorary Fellow, Swedish Association for Existential Psychotherapy (SEPT)
 2005 – Honorary Professor, University of Sheffield
 2001 – Fellow, British Association for Counselling and Psychotherapy (BACP)
 1999 – Fellow, British Psychological Society (BPS)
 1999–2002 - Official Delegate to the Council of Europe, for the European Association for Psychotherapy (EAP)
 1998–1999 - Chair of the British Psychological Society, Psychotherapy Section
 1998 – Honorary European Certificate for Psychotherapy
 1997–1999 - Chair of the Universities Psychotherapy Association (UPCA)
 1995–2002 - European Association for Psychotherapy (EAP) Ambassador

Books
 Rising from Existential Crisis: Living Beyond Calamity, (2021) Monmouth: Monmouth: PCCS books. 
 Wiley World Handbook for Existential Therapy, (2019) Co-edited with Craig, E., Schneider K. Längle, A., Tantam, D. and du Plock, S, London: Wiley 
 Existential Therapy: Distinctive Features, London: Routledge. (2018) Co-authored with Claire Arnold-Baker, London: Routledge 
 Skills in Existential Counselling and Psychotherapy,  2nd Edition (2016). Co-authored with Martin Adams, London: Sage. 
 Paradox and Passion in Psychotherapy, Second Edition (2015). Chichester: Wiley
 Existential Perspectives on Relationship Therapy (2013). Edited with Susan Iacovou, London: Palgrave Macmillan. 
 Existential Psychotherapy and Counselling in Practice, Third Edition (2012), London: Sage Publications
 Existential Perspectives on Coaching (2012). Co-edited with Monica Hanway, London: Palgrave, Macmillan
 Skills in Existential Counselling and Psychotherapy (2011). Co-authored with Martin Adams, London: Sage Publications
 Everyday Mysteries: A Handbook of Existential Psychotherapy, Second Edition (2010), London: Routledge
 Existential Perspectives on Supervision (2009). Co-edited with Sarah Young, London: Palgrave Macmillan
 Psychotherapy and the Quest for Happiness (2008), London: Sage Publications
 Dictionary of Existential Psychotherapy and Counselling (2005). With Raymond Kenward, London: Sage
 Existential Perspectives on Existential and Human Issues (2005). Edited with Claire Arnold-Baker, Basingstoke: Palgrave, Macmillan
 Existential Psychotherapy and Counselling in Practice, Second Edition (2002), London: Sage
 Paradox and Passion in Psychotherapy (1998), Chichester: Wiley
 Everyday Mysteries: Existential Dimensions of Psychotherapy (1997), London: Routledge
 Existential Counselling in Practice (1988), London: Sage

References

Further reading

 © SACRI

Interviews with Emmy van Deurzen

https://www.youtube.com/watch?v=6HmiOBnfFL4
https://www.youtube.com/watch?v=Yzt23ifzK6M
https://www.youtube.com/watch?v=yevcbeWqyy4
https://www.youtube.com/watch?v=jdt7mBUlBGQ
https://www.youtube.com/watch?v=gv8OEhYE6c8

External links

Emmy read her essay ‘Becoming an Existential Therapist’ on BBC Radio 3 on 15 November 2013: http://www.bbc.co.uk/programmes/b03hjw9f

1951 births
Living people
Dutch psychologists
Psychotherapists
Psychodramatists
People in health professions from The Hague
Existential therapists
Dutch women psychologists
Philosophical counselors
Dutch emigrants to England